The Kingdom of Thailand has submitted films for the Academy Award for Best International Feature Film since 1984, when it became the second independent nation in Southeast Asia to join the competition, after the Philippines. The award is given annually by the Academy of Motion Picture Arts and Sciences to a feature-length motion picture produced outside the United States that contains primarily non-English dialogue.

To date Thailand has submitted twenty-four films to AMPAS for Oscar consideration but thus far no Thai candidate has received an Oscar nomination. Four submissions were directed by Chatrichalerm Yukol, a member of the Thai nobility, and four were directed by Pen-Ek Ratanaruang.

Submissions
The Academy of Motion Picture Arts and Sciences has invited the film industries of various countries to submit their best film for the Academy Award for Best Foreign Language Film since 1956. The Foreign Language Film Award Committee oversees the process and reviews all the submitted films. Following this, they vote via secret ballot to determine the five nominees for the award.

Thai Oscar submissions are selected annually by the Federation of National Film Associations of Thailand. All submissions were made in Thai.

The selection committee of the Federation of National Film Associations of Thailand generally has chosen movies that highlight key moments in Thai history or important social issues.

 Thailand's five earliest submissions all dealt with contemporary social problems included Nam Poo (drug abuse), The Elephant Keeper (environmentalism and illegal logging), Song of the Chaophraya (prostitution and rural migration to Bangkok), Once Upon A Time (child poverty) and Daughter 2 (AIDS).
 Four Thai submissions were fact-based period dramas - King Naresuan Part 2 was a lavish costume drama set in the sixteenth century about one of Thailand's most distinguished kings; The Overture tells the life story of one of Thailand's greatest classical musicians from the 1880s until the 1940s; The Tin Mine is about a spoiled rich kid who ends up working in the titular mine in Southern Thailand in the years following World War II; The Moonhunter followed a band of controversial, leftist rebels in the 1970s.
 Three Thai submissions were fast-paced thrillers, two of which incorporated strong elements of Buddhism and karma into their plots, namely Who is Running? and Ahimsa...Stop to Run. Also submitted was 6ixtynin9, about a recently laid-off woman who finds a huge cache of stolen money.
 Two submissions were romantic comedy-dramas that were box office hits domestically. Love of Siam featured a gay teen romance, and Best of Times featured two potential couples, one in their 20s and one in their 60s.
 Also submitted were a bittersweet genre-bending musical-comedy-drama-romance (Monrak Transistor in 2002) and a surreal, arty drama in Japanese, English and Thai (Last Life in the Universe in 2003).

See also
Cinema of Thailand
List of Thai films

Notes 

A: Also shortlisted in 2015: Back to the 90s (Yanyong Kuruangkura), The Blue Hour (Anucha Boonyawattana), F. Hilaire (Surassawadee Chueachart), Heart Attack (Nawapol Thamrongrattanarit) and Maebia (Bhandevanop Devakula). Source: https://www.voicetv.co.th/read/262266
B: Also shortlisted in 2016: The Crown (Ekachai Sriwichai), The Island Funeral (Pimpaka Towira) and Snap (Kongdej Jaturanrassamee). Source: https://jediyuth.com/2016/09/19/thailand-selects-ar-bat-karma-as-oscars-entry/
C: Also shortlisted in 2017: Bad Genius (Nattawut Poonpiriya), Pop Aye (Kirsten Tan) and Song from Phatthalung (Boonsong Nakphoo). Source: https://jediyuth.com/2017/08/30/thailand-selects-by-the-time-it-gets-dark-for-oscars-foreign-language-category
D: Also shortlisted in 2018: Die Tomorrow (Nawapol Thamrongrattanarit) and Samui Song (Pen-ek Rattanaruang). Source: https://jediyuth.com/2018/09/18/thailand-selects-malila-the-farewell-flower-for-foreign-language-category/
E: Also shortlisted in 2019: Manta Ray (Phuttiphong Aroonpheng), Nha Haan (Chantana Tiprachart), Norah (Ekachai Sriwichai) and Where We Belong (Kongdej Jaturanrassamee). Source: https://jediyuth.com/2019/09/23/thailand-selects-inhuman-kiss-for-92th-oscar-awards/
F: Also shortlisted in 2020: The Cave (Tom Waller), Dew (Matthew Chookiat Sakveerakul), Nemesis (Gunparwitt Phuvadolwisit) and Waning Moon (Arthit Ariyawongsa, Thirakaha Ariyawongsa). Source:

Notes

References

Academy Awards, List of Thailand's entries
Academy Awards, List of Thailand's entries
Thailand